Frank 'Funny' Heinemann (born 8 January 1965) is a German football coach, he is the currently assistant manager Bundesliga of VfL Bochum and a retired player.

Coaching career
From 1996 until 2009, Heinemann was the assistant manager of VfL Bochum. He was appointed as the caretaker manager of Bochum's Bundesliga team on 21 September 2009 until a new manager was appointed on 27 October. Between 1 March 2010 and 14 March 2011, Heinemann was youth coordinator of VfL Bochum.

On 16 March 2019 he briefly took over KFC Uerdingen as caretaker manager.

References

External links

Frank Heinemann at Footballdatabase

1965 births
Living people
German footballers
German football managers
VfL Bochum managers
KFC Uerdingen 05 managers
Sportspeople from Bochum
VfL Bochum players
VfL Bochum II players
Bundesliga players
2. Bundesliga players
Oberliga (football) players
Bundesliga managers
2. Bundesliga managers
3. Liga managers
Association football midfielders
Footballers from North Rhine-Westphalia